Double H High Adventure Base, located on the Plains of San Agustin near Datil, New Mexico, was a satellite program base of the Boy Scouts of America's (BSA) Philmont Scout Ranch from 2004 to 2009. The Double H High Adventure Base was located at the Torstenson Family Wildlife Center, formerly known as the Double H Ranch. The Double H was made possible through a partnership with the Rocky Mountain Elk Foundation and the Boy Scouts of America.

In 2008, the Boy Scouts of America announced that the Double H High Adventure Base would conclude six years of operation with the 2009 season, no reservations would be accepted for the 2010 season.

Double H was designed to provide crews with a unique and rugged high adventure back-packing experience. Crews arriving at Double H base camp are teamed up with a wilderness guide; this guide will spend the entire trek with the crew, providing training and program.

Crews were given opportunities to hike through canyons, navigate cross-country using a map and compass. Scouts will also get the opportunity to use a GPS device while Geocaching.   Base camp was located at over 7,000 feet. Significant elevation changes occur as crews hike through the open ponderosa forest and participate in the program.  In addition to ponderosa forests, participants had the opportunity to see many varieties of cacti, pinon trees, juniper trees and elk.

Itinerary

On the morning of their first day, participating crews arrive at the Double H and go through base camp where they receive their crew gear and food. Crews also receive an orientation from their wilderness guide and then head to the backcountry that afternoon.

On their fourth day, crews arrive at the Martin Camp where they are given the opportunity to resupply and participate in a western dinner. Each crew has a chance to shoot inline black powder rifles, try their hand at a 3-D archery course, and participate in Search and Rescue training.

From the second to third day and from the fifth to sixth day, crews explore the Double H. With no established trail system, and no naturally occurring surface water, the Double H is considered by many to be a true rugged, southwestern experience. Along the way, the wilderness guide provides program for the members of the crew.  This program includes challenge course, Leave No Trace, astronomy, geocaching, search and rescue and a conservation project.

References

External links
Double H online store
Double H Journal
Torstenson Wildlife Center

Philmont Scout Ranch